George James McIlraith,  (July 29, 1908 – August 19, 1992) was a lawyer and Canadian Parliamentarian.

The son of James McIlraith and Kate McLeod, he was educated at Osgoode Hall and practised law in Ottawa. In 1935, he married Margaret Summers.

McIlraith was first elected to the House of Commons of Canada in the 1940 federal election as the Liberal Member of Parliament for Ottawa West. He was subsequently re-elected on nine successive occasions.

McIlraith joined the Cabinet of Lester Pearson when the Liberals formed government following the 1963 federal election as Minister of Transport. From 1964 until 1967, he was Government House Leader in charge of the Pearson minority government's parliamentary strategy for much of its tenure, including during the Great Flag Debate and parliamentary debates on the introduction of Medicare.

He also served as Pearson's Minister of Public Works from 1965 on, and was also Pierre Trudeau's first public works minister. He served as Solicitor-General of Canada from 1968 until 1970 under Trudeau, who appointed him to the Senate of Canada in 1972.

The George McIlraith Bridge over the Rideau River is named for him.

References 

1908 births
1992 deaths
Lawyers in Ontario
Canadian King's Counsel
Canadian Ministers of Transport
Canadian Presbyterians
Canadian senators from Ontario
Liberal Party of Canada MPs
Liberal Party of Canada senators
Members of the House of Commons of Canada from Ontario
Members of the King's Privy Council for Canada
Politicians from Ottawa
20th-century Canadian lawyers
Solicitors General of Canada